Pocahontas was a Pamunkey Algonquian chief's daughter from early American history.

Pocahontas may also refer to:

Film and television
 Pocahontas (1910 film), a silent film
 Pocahontas (1994 film), a Japanese animated film by Toshiyuki Hiruma Takashi
 Pocahontas (1995 film), a Disney film
 Pocahontas (character)
 Pocahontas (franchise)
 Pocahontas (soundtrack)
 Pocahontas: The Legend, a 1995 Canadian feature film
 Pocahontas, a 1995 animation by Burbank Animation Studios
 Pocahontas, a 1995 animation by Golden Films
 Pocahontas, a 1997 animated TV series by Mondo TV
 "Pocahontas", an episode of Animated Hero Classics

Places

Canada
 Pocahontas, Alberta, Canada, a campground and unincorporated area

United States
 Pocahontas, Arkansas, a city
 Pocahontas, Illinois, a village
 Pocahontas, Iowa, a city and county seat
 Pocahontas County, Iowa
 Pocahontas, Mississippi, an unincorporated community
 Pocahontas, Missouri, a village
 Pocahontas, Oregon, a former community
 Pocahontas, Tennessee, an unincorporated community
 Pocahontas, Coffee County, Tennessee, an unincorporated community
 Pocahontas, Virginia, a town
 Fort Pocahontas, an American Civil War fortification in Charles City County, Virginia
 Pocahontas County, West Virginia

Schools

United States
 Pocahontas School District, Arkansas
 Pocahontas High School (Arkansas)
 Pocahontas Area Community School District, Iowa
 Pocahontas High School (Iowa), winner of the 2001 National High School Mock Trial Championship
 Pocahontas School, a former elementary school in Pocahontas, Tennessee

Ships
 USS Pocahontas (1852), a screw steamer
 USS Pocahontas (AT-18), an ocean tug renamed Chemung in 1917
 USS Pocahontas (ID-3044), a troop transport during World War I
 USS Pocahontas (YT-266), a tug transferred to Naval service in 1942
 SS Pocahontas (1900), an ocean liner
 SS Pocahontas (1942), a Liberty ship

Other uses
 MC Pocahontas, a former stage name of Brazilian singer-songwriter Viviane de Queiroz Pereira (later known as Pocah)
 Pocahontas (horse), Thoroughbred racehorse
 Pocahontas (nickname), a nickname used by Donald Trump to refer to Elizabeth Warren
 "Pocahontas" (song), a 1979 song by Neil Young from Rust Never Sleeps
 Pocahantas (train), a Norfolk and Western Railway passenger train from 1926 to 1971
 Pocahontas (video game), a video game based on the Disney film
 Po-ca-hon-tas, or The Gentle Savage, an 1855 musical burlesque by John Brougham
 4487 Pocahontas, an asteroid
 Pocahontas, a statue by William Ordway Partridge

See also
 Degree of Pocahontas, the female auxiliary of an American fraternal order
 Lower Thames and Medway Passenger Boat Company, a company that operates the MV Princess Pocahontas river tour boat
 Pocahontas Coalfield, a coalfield in Virginia and West Virginia
 Pocahontas Mounds, an archaeological site in Hinds County, Mississippi
 Pocahontas Stakes, an American annual horse race
 Pocahontas State Correctional Center, a prison in Virginia
 Pocahontas State Park, a park in Chesterfield, Virginia